Monterey Accelerated Research System (MARS) is a cabled-based observatory system below the surface of Monterey Bay, developed and managed by the Monterey Bay Aquarium Research Institute. The system, operational since November 10, 2008, incorporates a  undersea cable that carries data and power to benthic instrument nodes, AUVs, and various benthic and moored instrumentation.

See also
NEPTUNE
VENUS

References

External links 
 OceanPortal information

Monterey Bay
Oceanography
Monterey Bay Aquarium
Research projects
Underwater work
Science and technology in California